Narbrook Park Historic District, also known as Narberth Garden, is a national historic district located in Narberth, Montgomery County, Pennsylvania. It encompasses 51 contributing buildings, one contributing structure and one contributing site in the planned garden suburb of Narbrook Park.  It was developed between 1915 and 1938.  The dwellings reflect a number of popular architectural styles primarily Bungalow / American Craftsman and Dutch Colonial Revival.  The community features 35 detached houses and dedicated open space.

It was added to the National Register of Historic Places in 2003.

References

Historic districts on the National Register of Historic Places in Pennsylvania
Colonial Revival architecture in Pennsylvania
Historic districts in Montgomery County, Pennsylvania
National Register of Historic Places in Montgomery County, Pennsylvania